Three Degrees of Influence is a theory in the realm of social networks, proposed by Nicholas A. Christakis and James H. Fowler in 2007. It has since been explored by scientists in numerous disciplines using diverse statistical, psychological, sociological, and biological approaches.

Christakis and Fowler explored the influence of social connections on behavior. They described how social influence does not end with the people to whom a person is directly connected. People influence their friends, who in turn influence their friends, and so on; hence, a person's beliefs and actions can influence people they have never met, to whom they are only indirectly tied. Christakis and Fowler posited that diverse phenomena "ripple through our network, having an impact on our friends (one degree), our friends’ friends (two degrees), and even our friends’ friends’ friends (three degrees). Our influence gradually dissipates and ceases to have a noticeable effect on people beyond the social frontier that lies at three degrees of separation." They posited a number of reasons for this decay, and they offered informational, psychological, and biological rationales.

This argument is basically that peer effects need not stop at one degree of separation. However, across a broad set of empirical settings, using both observational and experimental methods, they observed that the effect seems, in many cases, to no longer be meaningful at a social horizon of three degrees.

Using both observational and experimental methods, Christakis and Fowler examined phenomena from various domains, such as obesity, happiness, cooperation, voting, and various public health beliefs and behaviors. Investigations by other groups have subsequently explored many other phenomena in this way (including crime, social learning, etc.).

Rationale
Influence dissipates after three degrees (to and from friends’ friends’ friends) for three reasons, Christakis and Fowler propose:
 Intrinsic decay—corruption of information, or a kind of "social friction" (like the game telephone).
 Network instability—social ties become unstable (and are not constant across time) at a horizon of more than three degrees of separation.
 Evolutionary purpose—we evolved in small groups where everyone was connected by three degrees or fewer (an idea receiving subsequent support ).

Scientific literature
Initial studies using observational data by Christakis and Fowler suggested that a variety of attributes (like obesity, smoking, and happiness), rather than being individualistic, are casually correlated by contagion mechanisms that transmit such phenomena over long distances within social networks. Certain subsequent analyses have explored limitations to these analyses (subject to different statistical assumptions); or have expressed concern that the statistical methods employed in these analyses cannot fully control for other environmental factors; or have noted that the statistical estimates arising from some approaches may not always have straightforward interpretations; or have argued that the statistical methods may not always account for homophily processes in the creation and retention of relationships over time.

But other scholarship using sensitivity analysis has found that the basic estimates regarding the transmissibility of obesity and smoking cessation, for example, are quite robust, or has otherwise replicated or supported the findings. Additional, detailed modeling work published in 2016 showed that the GEE modeling approach used by Christakis and Fowler (and others) was quite effective for estimating social contagion effects and in distinguishing them from homophily. This paper concluded, "For network influence, we find that the approach appears to have excellent sensitivity, and quite good specificity with regard to distinguishing the presence or absence of such a 'network effect,' regardless of whether or not homophily is present in network formation. This was true for small cohorts (n = 30) and larger cohorts (n = 1000), and for cohorts that displayed lesser and greater realism in their distribution of friendships."  Another methodological paper concluded that it is indeed possible to bound estimates of peer effects even given the modeling constraints faced by Christakis and Fowler —even if parametric assumptions are otherwise required to identify such effects using observational data (if substantial unobserved homophily is thought to be present).

Additional support for the modeling approach used by Christakis and Fowler provided by other authors has continued to appear. From a theoretical perspective, it has been shown  that this property naturally emerges as the outcome of the interplay between social influence, or learning dynamics, and complex networks. These studies employ emblematic models used to study the diffusion of information, opinions, ideas and behaviors on a wide range of network topologies, showing also under which conditions violations of the "three degrees of influence” can be expected including of the three-degrees-of-influence property. Additional analytic approaches to observational data have also been supportive, including matched sample estimation, and reshuffling techniques. The reshuffling technique validated the "edge directionality test" as an identification strategy for causal peer effects; this technique was first proposed by Christakis and Fowler as a tool for estimating such effects in network analysis in their 2007 obesity paper.

Christakis and Fowler reviewed critical and supportive findings regarding the three degrees of influence phenomenon and the analytic approaches used to discern it with observational data in 2013.

In addition, subsequent experimental studies (by many research groups, including Christakis and Fowler) have found strong causal evidence of behavioral contagion processes that spread beyond dyads (including out to two, three, or four degrees of separation) using randomized controlled experiments, including one experiment involving 61,000,000 people that showed spread of voting behavior out to two degrees of separation. A 2014 paper also confirmed the spread of emotions beyond dyads, as proposed in 2008 by Christakis and Fowler, using another massive online experiment. The "three degrees of influence" property has also been noted by other groups using observational data regarding criminal networks.

Diverse lines of work have also explored the specific biopsychosocial mechanisms for the boundedness of contagion effects, some of which had been theorized by Christakis and Fowler. Experiments by Moussaid et al. evaluated the spread of risk perception, and documented inflection at approximately three degrees. Another set of experiments documented the impact of information distortion, noting that "despite strong social influence within pairs of individuals, the reach of judgment propagation across a chain rarely exceeded a social distance of three to four degrees of separation.... We show that information distortion and the overweighting of other people’s errors are two individual-level mechanisms hindering judgment propagation at the scale of the chain." And experiments with fMRI scans in a sociocentrically mapped network of graduate students, published in 2018, showed that neural responses to conceptual stimuli were similar between friends, with a nadir at three degrees of separation, providing further biological evidence for this theory.

The theory has also been used to develop validated algorithms for efficient influence maximization.

Moral implications
The idea of network influence raises the question of free will, because it suggests that people are influenced by factors which they cannot control and which they are not aware of. Christakis and Fowler claim in their book, Connected, that policy makers should use  knowledge about social network effects in order to create a better society with a more efficient public policy. This applies to many aspects of life, from public health to economics. For instance, when resources are scarce, they note that it might be preferable to immunize individuals located in the center of a network in preference to structurally peripheral individuals. Or, it might be much more effective to motivate clusters of people to avoid criminal behavior than to act upon individuals or than to punish each criminal separately. Their subsequent work has explored how to use social contagion to foster the spread of desirable innovations in rural villages.

See also
 Mark Granovetter
 Six degrees of separation
 The Tipping Point

References

External links
 Article concerning three degrees of influence

Sociological theories